Self-Portrait in a Gorget is a c.1629 oil on panel self-portrait by Rembrandt, now in the Germanisches Nationalmuseum in Nuremberg.

Sources
http://objektkatalog.gnm.de/objekt/Gm391

Paintings in Nuremberg
Self-portraits by Rembrandt
1629 paintings
17th-century portraits